The following is a list of concert tours given by The Cheetah Girls.

Cheetah-licious Christmas Tour

In late 2005, The Cheetah Girls went on tour to support their Christmas album, Cheetah-licious Christmas. Aly & AJ went along with them, as the opening act, to support their own album Into the Rush. The Jonas Brothers also performed as surprise guests for a total of 10 shows of the tour, promoting their debut album It's About Time. The holiday theme of the concert included giant presents (in which the Cheetah Girls performed in), winter clothes, and even a tropical theme for their song "Christmas in California", which included surf boards with the girls' names on them. The Cheetah Girls also sang songs from the first Cheetah Girls movie soundtrack, the cover of "I Won't Say (I'm in Love)" (from DisneyMania 3), and their version of "Shake a Tail Feather" (from the Chicken Little soundtrack).

Opening acts
 Aly & AJ
 Jonas Brothers (December 6–17, 2005)

Setlist
 "Cheetah-licious Christmas"
 "Five More Days 'til Christmas"
 "A Marshmallow World"
 "Santa Claus Is Coming to Town"
 "Perfect Christmas"
 "Cinderella"
 "Shake a Tail Feather"
 "Christmas in California"
 "Together We Can"
 "Girl Power"
 "Cheetah Sisters"
 "No Ordinary Christmas"
 "All I Want for Christmas Is You"
 "The Simple Things"
 "This Christmas"
 "I Saw Mommy Kissing Santa Claus"
 "Last Christmas"
 "I Won't Say (I'm in Love)"
 "Feliz Navidad"

Tour dates

The Party's Just Begun Tour

One World Tour

The One World Tour is the final concert tour by the American group, The Cheetah Girls. It supports the soundtrack to their third film, The Cheetah Girls: One World. The tour played over 40 concerts in the United States and Canada.

Background
The tour was announced on August 12, 2008, ten days before the premiere of their final film, The Cheetah Girls: One World. The tour was originally set to begin in Austin, Texas, but a rehearsal show was added in Corpus Christi, Texas. The concert benefited the Corpus Christi Independent School District. Midway through the tour, it was plagued with controversy as band member Adrienne Bailon had explicit photos leaked online. Bailon stated that the photos were stolen from her laptop, at the JFK Airport. Backlash ensued with a few tour dates being cancelled, including a performance at the Macy's Thanksgiving Day Parade. American publication Us Weekly later reported the act was a publicity stunt to break Bailon from the typical Disney star image.

Opening acts
 Clique Girlz
 535 (select shows)
 KSM

Setlist

Act 1;
"Intro"
"Cheetah Love"
"So Bring It On"
"Dig a Little Deeper"

Act 2;
"Feels Like Love"
"Strut"

Act 3;
"Cinderella"
"What If" (performed by Adrienne Bailon)

Act 4;
"Girl Power"
"Break Out This Box"
"Dance Me If You Can"
"No Place Like Us"

Act 5;
"The Party's Just Begun"
"Crazy on the Dance Floor" (performed by Sabrina Bryan)
"Fuego"
"Homesick"

Act 6;
"Commander Kiely" (performed by Kiely Williams)
"Shake a Tail Feather"
"Route 66"

Encore;
"One World"

Tour dates 

Cancellations and rescheduled shows

Box office score data

References

Tours
Lists of concert tours